Katherine Johanna Hagedorn (October 16, 1961November 12, 2013) was an American ethnomusicologist. Born in Summit, New Jersey to a white family, she became a traditional Cuban drummer and Santería priestess.

She spent her career as a Professor of Music at Pomona College in Claremont, California, where she directed the Ethnomusicology Program, served as co-coordinator of the Gender & Women’s Studies Program, and became an associate dean. She also served as a "scholar-in-residence at Harvard University’s Center for the Study of World Religions and as a visiting professor at the University of California, Santa Barbara."

Trained in languages and classical piano at Tufts University, Hagedorn earned an M.A. in Soviet Studies at Johns Hopkins University. She became a White House fellow, and worked on the Afghanistan desk at the State Department.

Starting in 1989, Hagedorn traveled to Cuba to study the batá drum in Matanzas Province. There, she was initiated as a Santería priestess. At Pomona, she taught the batá drum, Tuvan throat singing, and directed a Balinese Gamelan ensemble. Her classes were described as "emphatically participatory, not to mention loud."

Her best known work is Divine Utterances: The Performance of Afro-Cuban Santería.

Works

References

External links

"Tangible Effects of Preserving Intangible Culture in Cuba : Afro-Cuban Religious Performance and the Conjunto Folklórico Nacional – A Case Study", an article by katherine J. Hagedorn at lameca.org

1961 births
2013 deaths
Ethnomusicologists
American Santeríans
Harvard Divinity School
Tufts University School of Arts and Sciences alumni
Johns Hopkins University alumni
Pomona College faculty
Women's studies academics
People from Summit, New Jersey
Place of death missing
White House Fellows